Kyhl is a surname. Notable people with the surname include:

Christian Kyhl (1762–1827), Danish gunsmith and inventor
Henrik Kyhl (1793–1866), Danish clockmaker and politician 
Vernon Kyhl (1908–1973), American politician

See also
Kyl (disambiguation)
Kyle (disambiguation)